The 2015–16 Essex Senior Football League season was the 45th in the history of Essex Senior Football League, a football competition in England.

League table

The league featured 19 clubs which competed in the league last season, along with two new clubs:
Burnham Ramblers, relegated from the Isthmian League 
Wadham Lodge, promoted from the Essex Olympian League

Also, Greenhouse London changed their name to Greenhouse Sports.

Redbridge were initially relegated from Isthmian League Division One North, however, they were later reprieved by the FA's league committee.

Three clubs have applied for promotion to Step 4: Bowers & Pitsea, FC Romania and Ilford.

League table

References

Essex Senior Football League seasons
9